Wang Yaoqing (born 15 July 1974), also known as David Wang, is a Taiwanese actor.

Early life and education 
Wang was born in Taipei on 15 July 1974. He attended the Fu Jen Catholic University, majoring in Mass Communications.

Career 
Wang debuted in Taiwanese entertainment and acted in several television series. He became known for his role in the drama Sun Flower. He then acted in several stage plays and established his position in the industry.

In 2011, Wang starred in the hit romance film Love is Not Blind and was nominated for the Best Supporting Actor award at the Hundred Flowers Awards. In 2012, Wang starred in the spy drama Fu Chen and was nominated for the Best Supporting Actor award at the Huading Awards. In 2013, Wang starred in the family drama The Sweet Burden and Little Daddy;. which led to a rise in popularity for Wang. Wang won the Best Actor award at the  Macau International Television Festival for his performance in Little Daddy. He then played lead roles in the medical drama Obstetrician, and historical drama Esoterica of Qing Dynasty where he portrayed Qianlong.

In 2016, Wang starred in the slice-of-life romance drama To Be a Better Man, and was named as one of the Audience's Favorite Actors at the Huading Awards. The same year he starred in the family drama Keep the Marriage as Jade and won the Best Supporting Actor award at the  Macau International Television Festival.

In 2020, Wang starred in the romantic comedy drama Find Yourself.

Filmography

Film

Television series

Awards and nominations

References

1974 births
Living people
Male actors from Taipei
Fu Jen Catholic University alumni
Taiwanese expatriates in China
21st-century Taiwanese male actors
Taiwanese male television actors
Taiwanese male film actors